KMRB may refer to:

 KMRB, a radio station licensed to San Gabriel, California, United States
 Eastern WV Regional Airport, serving Martinsburg, West Virginia, United States
 Korea Media Rating Board, a South Korean entertainment ratings organisation